The 1932 presidential election may refer to:
 1932 Chilean presidential election
 1932 German presidential election
 1932 United States presidential election